California Tortilla, also known as Cal Tort, is an American chain of franchised fast casual Mexican-style restaurants, the first of which was opened in August 1995 in Bethesda, Maryland by business partners Pam Felix and Alan Cohen. The chain's menu is comparable to that of its competitors, such as Baja Fresh and Chipotle Mexican Grill. A typical restaurant has  with seating for 75 people. California Tortilla was voted by readers of Washingtonian magazine as having the best burritos in both 2009 and 2010, and "best Mexican" in 2014 and 2015.  In 2019, it was awarded Best Fast Casual by Washington City Paper readers.

Locations
California Tortilla has 38 restaurant locations in 8 states (Maryland, Virginia, West Virginia, New Jersey, Pennsylvania, Connecticut, Kansas, South Carolina), and the District of Columbia. Some airport locations are branded as Burrito Elito. The chain is headquartered in Potomac, Maryland.

Atmosphere

California Tortilla's staff members are encouraged to be "unique" and "fun", which can vary by location. A monthly Taco Talk newsletter was published online and in print for 20 years by co-founder Pam Felix, whose picture appeared for years (along with partner Alan Cohen's) on some of the restaurant's paper goods.  With Issue 245, dated December 1, 2015, Felix retired from writing Taco Talk.

Promotions
Patrons of California Tortilla experience a variety of promotions that offer free food or discount coupons. Some of the promotions are typical of restaurants, such as a free taco to those who join the email list. Other promotions are somewhat unusual, such as Free Pop-Tart Day. In 2008, California Tortilla attempted to break the record for the world's largest rock, paper, scissors game. Subscribers of the email newsletter receive occasional "secret" promotions, and a "Burrito Elito" loyalty program allows registered customers to receive points, based on pre-tax totals, with each 75 points resulting in a $5 discount.

Year-round promotions include the "Monday Night Mystery Prize Burrito Wheel", where any customer who purchases an entree every Monday night after 5:00 p.m. can spin the wheel and win a prize. The prizes range from a free cookie or brownie to $1 off their next purchase or a free signature salad.

Grand openings

To celebrate the opening of a new location, California Tortilla opens with a $5 burrito or bowl day with proceeds from the burrito/bowl donated to a local charity.

References

External links

1995 establishments in Maryland
Companies based in Rockville, Maryland
Potomac, Maryland
Economy of the Eastern United States
Fast casual restaurants
Hispanic and Latino American culture in Maryland
Mexican restaurants in the United States
Privately held companies based in Maryland
Regional restaurant chains in the United States
Restaurants established in 1995
Restaurants in Washington, D.C.